Abram Kryvosheiev (12 November 1933 – 2014) was a Belarusian middle-distance runner. He competed in the 800 metres at the 1960 Summer Olympics and the 1964 Summer Olympics, representing the Soviet Union.

References

External links
 

1933 births
2014 deaths
Athletes (track and field) at the 1960 Summer Olympics
Athletes (track and field) at the 1964 Summer Olympics
Belarusian male middle-distance runners
Soviet male middle-distance runners
Olympic athletes of the Soviet Union
Place of birth missing